Nagamatsu (written: 永松) is a Japanese surname. Notable people with the surname include:

, Japanese boxer
Sequoia Nagamatsu, American writer

See also
Nakamatsu

Japanese-language surnames